The following lists events that happened during 2006 in the Kingdom of Tonga.

Events

July
 July 1 - A man is arrested after crashing a car into the gates of King Taufa'ahau Tupou IV's residence in Auckland, New Zealand.

References

 
2000s in Tonga
Years of the 21st century in Tonga
Tonga
Tonga